The Sun and the Star is an upcoming fantasy novel co-written by authors Rick Riordan and Mark Oshiro. A standalone follow-up to the 2020 novel The Tower of Nero, it is set to be released in North America and the United Kingdom on May 2, 2023, and published by Hachette Books.

Premise
Nico di Angelo and his boyfriend Will Solace journey into Tartarus to rescue the Titan Iapetus.

Background
The Sun and the Star was announced on October 6, 2021. Rick Riordan decided to co-write this book with YA author Mark Oshiro to make sure that both Nico's point of view as a gay person and Nico and Will's romantic relationship would be as authentic as possible. Riordan and Oshiro created the synopsis and manuscript together and will receive equal credit for the book. In addition to writing acclaimed books about young LGBTQ+ characters, Oshiro is a longtime fan of the Percy Jackson universe.

On September 28, 2022, the cover art was announced alongside the final release date for the project. The cover art was done by Khadijah Khatib, and the release date for North America and the United Kingdom is May 2, 2023. Riordan also announced that he would be doing a limited North American tour with co-author Oshiro.

References

External links

Novels by Rick Riordan
Works based on classical mythology
Upcoming books
American LGBT novels
Gay male teen fiction
Young adult fantasy novels
Camp Half-Blood Chronicles